Sindri College, established in 1963, is a general degree college in Sindri, Jharkhand. It offers undergraduate courses in arts, commerce and sciences. It is affiliated to  Binod Bihari Mahto Koyalanchal University.

Accreditation
Sindri College was accredited by the National Assessment and Accreditation Council (NAAC).

See also
Education in India
Literacy in India
List of institutions of higher education in Jharkhand

References

External links
http://www.sindricollege.com/

Colleges affiliated to Binod Bihari Mahto Koyalanchal University
Universities and colleges in Jharkhand
Education in Dhanbad district
Educational institutions established in 1963
1963 establishments in Bihar